Gordon Cochrane Home (25 July 1878 – 13 December 1969) was an English landscape artist, writer, and illustrator.

Home was born in London. He worked as an art editor at "The Tatler", "The King" and later at the publishers A & C Black. He served as a Major in the Royal Army Service Corps from 1914 to 1920 in France and North Africa, and later travelled widely in North Africa, the British Empire and the Commonwealth.

Home worked mainly in watercolour and pen and ink and frequently exhibited at the Royal Academy. He exhibited at the first annual exhibition of the Society of Graphic Art in 1921. Home wrote and illustrated many travel and history books for A & C Black, J M Dent and other publishers.

Bibliography

Yorkshire; coast and moorland scenes (A & C Black, 1904).
The evolution of an English town (J. M. Dent & co., 1905)
Normandy: The Scenery & Romance of Its Ancient Towns (J M Dent & Co., 1905)
Yorkshire dales and fells (A & C Black, 1906).
Headlam, Cecil. Venetia and northern Italy (J M Dent, 1908).
Yorkshire vales and wolds (A & C Black, 1908).
Yorkshire Painted and Described (A & C Black, 1908).
Headlam, Cecil. Inns of Court (A & C Black, 1909)
The motor routes of France (A & C Black, 1910)
Home, Gordon & Matthison, William (illustrator). Cambridge (A & C Black, 1911).
Canterbury (A & C Black, 1911).
The English Lakes (A & C Black, 1911).
Stratford-on-Avon, a sketch-book (A & C Black, 1913).
Winchester, a sketch-book (A & C Black, 1914).
Foord, E. & Home, Gordon. The invasions of England (A & C Black, 1915).
France (A & C Black, 1918).
Through Yorkshire The County Of Broad Acres (J M Dent, 1922).
York, a sketch book  (A & C Black, 1922).
Roman York (London: Ernest Benn, 1924)
Through the Borders to the Heart of Scotland (J.M. Dent, London, 1924).
Home, Gordon & Foord, Edward. Bristol Bath And Malmesbury  (J M Dent, 1925)
Cathedrals, Abbeys & Famous Churches: Bristol, Bath & Malmesbury  (J M Dent, 1925.)
Hereford & Tintern Including Newport Cathedral & Llanthony Priory (J M Dent, 1925.)
Through East Anglia (J M Dent, 1925)
Through the Chilterns to the Fens (J M Dent, 1925)
Baikie, James. The Charm of the Scott Country (A & C Black, 1927)
Medieval London (London: Ernest Benn, 1927)
Roman Britain (London: Ernest Benn, 1927)
A history of London (London: Ernest Benn, 1929)
Old London Bridge (John Lane, 1931)
York Minster (J M Dent, 1936).

External links
Papers of Major Gordon Cochrane Home (1878-1969) (University of Edinburgh - accessed 27 Apr 2010).
 
 
 Further information the life of Gordon Home with portrait, images and focus on Normandy

19th-century English painters
English male painters
20th-century English painters
English illustrators
Landscape artists
English watercolourists
English travel writers
English historians
1969 deaths
1878 births
British Army personnel of World War I
Royal Army Service Corps officers
20th-century English male artists
19th-century English male artists